Openness is an overarching concept or philosophy that is characterized by an emphasis on transparency and collaboration. That is, openness refers to "accessibility of knowledge, technology and other resources; the transparency of action; the permeability of organisational structures; and the inclusiveness of participation". Openness can be said to be the opposite of closedness, central authority and secrecy.

Openness concept 
Openness has been attributed to a wide array of approaches in very different contexts as outlined below. While there is no universally accepted definition of the overarching concept of openness, a 2017 comprehensive review concludes that:

Open terminology can refer to a higher-order concept (e.g. the ‘‘philosophy of openness’’); the nature of resources (e.g. ‘‘open data’’); the nature of processes (e.g. ‘‘open innovation’’); or the effects on specific domains (e.g. ‘‘open education’’) [...] The principles typically used to characterize this higher-order concept are: access to information and other resources; participation in an inclusive and often collaborative manner; transparency of resources and actions; and democracy or ‘‘democratization’’ such as the breaking up of exclusionary structures.

In government 

Open government is the governing doctrine which holds that citizens have the right to access the documents and proceedings of the government to allow for effective public oversight.

Openness in government applies the idea of freedom of information to information held by authorities and holds that citizens should have the right to see the operations and activities of government at work.  Since reliable information is requisite for accountability, freedom of access to information about the government supports government accountability and helps protect other necessary rights.

In creative works 

Open content and free content both refer to creative works that lack restrictions on how people can use, modify, and distribute them.   The terms derive from open source software and free software, similar concepts that refer specifically to software.

In education 

Open education refers to institutional practices and programmatic initiatives that broaden access to the learning and training traditionally offered through formal education systems.  By eliminating barriers to entry, open education aids freedom of information by increasing accessibility.

Open Education advocates state people from all social classes worldwide have open access to high-quality education and resources. They help eliminate obstacles like high costs, outmoded materials, and legal instruments. These barriers impede collaboration among stakeholders. Cooperation is crucial to open education. The Open Education Consortium claims “Sharing is a fundamental attribute of education. Education means the sharing of knowledge, insights, and information with everybody. It is the foundation of new wisdom, ideas, talents, and understanding”. Open Educational Resources refer to learning materials that educators can improve and modify with permission from their publishers or authors. Creators of OERs are allowed to include a variety of items such as lesson plans, presentation slides, lecture videos, podcasts, worksheets, maps, and images.

There are legitimate tools like the Creative Commons’ licenses that students can access and use at liberty. They are allowed to translate and amend these materials. Public school teachers in the USA can share resources they developed as compliance for government-authorized standards in education. One of these is called the Common Core State Standards. Some teachers and school officials have recommended that OERs can help reduce expenses in production and distribution of course materials for primary and secondary institutions. Some teachers and school officials have recommended that OERs can help reduce expenses in production and distribution of course materials for primary and secondary institutions. Certain projects like the OER Commons as storage for open educational resources.

In science 

Open science refers to the practice of allowing peer-reviewed research articles to be available online free of charge and free of most copyright and licensing restrictions.  Benefits of this approach include: accelerated discovery and progress as researchers are free to use and build on the findings of others, giving back to the public as much research is paid for with public funds, and greater impact for one's work due to open access articles being accessible to a bigger audience.

In information technology 

In Open-source software, the user is given access to the sources such as source code. In Open-source hardware, the user gets access to sources such as design documents and blueprints. Open data is data that can be freely used and shared by anyone.

In psychology 
In psychology, openness to experience is one of the domains which are used to describe human personality in the Five Factor Model.

See also

 Accessibility
 Free association
 Free content
 Free software
 Glasnost
 Open source
 Open access: publishing
 Open innovation
 Open education
 Open educational resources
 Open-design movement
 Open government
 Open Knowledge Foundation
 Open knowledge
 Open-mindedness
 Open text
 Open gaming
 Open patent
 Open-source curriculum
 Open-source governance
 Open-source journalism
 Open-source model
 Open standard
 Openness to experience
 Secrecy: the opposite of openness
 The Open Definition
 Transparency: openness in a utilitarian view, economic openness, open economic or politic data, degree of openness, etc.

References
 

 

 
Transparency (behavior)